is a subway station in Minato, Tokyo, Japan, operated by the Tokyo subway operator Toei Subway. The station is named after the Shiba Daimon or Great Gate of Shiba, located just west of the station on the road leading to the temple of Zōjō-ji.

Daimon is adjacent to Hamamatsuchō Station, which is served by JR East and the Tokyo Monorail. On the Toei lines, Daimon is called "Daimon Hamamatsucho" in certain automated announcements. The Oedo Line station, which occupies most of the space between the Asakusa Line and the JR lines, was initially planned to be called "Hamamatsucho", but ultimately adopted the name of the existing Asakusa Line station.

Lines
Toei Asakusa Line (Station A-09)
Toei Ōedo Line (Station E-20)

Station layout
The Asakusa Line station has two side platforms. The Oedo Line station has one island platform.

Platforms

History
October 1, 1964: Opened as a station on Toei Subway Line No. 1 (Asakusa Line).
December 12, 2000: Oedo Line service begins.

Passenger statistics
The Asakusa Line station was used by an average of around 91,000 arriving and departing passengers per day, while the Oedo Line station was used by an average of around 114,000.

References

Railway stations in Japan opened in 1964
Toei Asakusa Line
Toei Ōedo Line
Stations of Tokyo Metropolitan Bureau of Transportation
Railway stations in Tokyo